Football at the 2022 Mediterranean Games took place between 26 June and 5 July 2022 at the Ahmed Zabana Stadium, Mers El Hadjadj Stadium and Abdelkrim Kerroum Stadium. Associations affiliated with FIFA were invited to send their men's U-18, U-19 and U-21 national teams. There was no women's tournament on this occasion.

Participating nations
Nine nations have applied to compete in men's tournament, one more than at the previous games. None of the Asian nations opted to compete.

Men

Squads

Venues
4 stadiums were allocated to host the matches.

Group stage

Group A

Group B

Knockout stage

Semifinals

Bronze medal match

Gold medal match

Final standings

Goalscorers

References

External links
Official site
Results book

 
Sports at the 2022 Mediterranean Games
2022
Mediterranean Games
2022
2022 in youth association football